The Filmfare Best Music Album Award is given by the Filmfare magazine as part of its annual Filmfare Awards for Hindi films, to the best composer/arranger of a soundtrack. This category was first presented in 1954. Naushad Ali was the first recipient of this award for his song "Tu Ganga Ki Mauj" from the film Baiju Bawra. For the first two years, it was awarded to the composer for a particular song and not the entire album. From 1956 onwards, awards in this category have been given for the entire soundtrack. From 2017, the name of this was category changed from best music direction to music album.

Superlatives

 A. R. Rahman leads the winners with 10 awards, followed by the music director duo of Shankar–Jaikishan, who have 9. Laxmikant Pyarelal have the most nominations with 25, followed by Shankar–Jaikishan with 20, and R. D. Burman with 17.
 Shankar–Jaikishan holds the record for the highest number of consecutive-year nominations (9), having been nominated for the award every year from 1959 till 1967, winning the award four times from 10 total nominations.
 Laxmikant Pyarelal and A. R. Rahman have the distinction of winning the award four times in a row between 1978 and 1981 and between 2007 and 2010, respectively. Those who have won the award thrice in a row are Shankar–Jaikishan (1971–1973) and Nadeem Shravan (1991–1993). Also, there have been three instances when a music director (or duo) were nominated thrice in the same year – Bappi Lahiri in 1985, Laxmikant Pyarelal in 1986 and A. R. Rahman in 2009.
 Pritam received six consecutive nominations between 2013 and 2018, and won in 2013, 2017 and 2018.
 Usha Khanna, Sneha Khanwalkar, Parampara Thakur and Jasleen Royal are the only four women to have ever been nominated for this award. They were nominated for their work in the Souten (1983), Gangs of Wasseypur (2012),Kabir Singh (2020) and Shershaah (2022) respectively. Parampara Thakur won the award, becoming the first women to do so. In 2022, Jasleen Royal has become the second woman to win this. 
 Jatin–Lalit has never won this award after getting 12 nominations from (1992–2006), followed by Vishal–Shekhar who have yet to win the award after getting 10 nominations from (2005–2019).
 Anu Malik won a Special Award in 2001 for the film Refugee.

Most wins

Multiple nominees
Multiple music directors (or duo/trio) have received multiple Best Music Director nominations.

Winners and nominees
In the list below, the winner of the award for each year is shown first, followed by the other nominees. The films are listed by the years when the award was presented. The announcing of nominations became regular after 1956.

1950s

1960s

1970s

1980s

1990s

2000s

2010s

2020s

See also
 Filmfare Awards
 Bollywood
 Cinema of India
 Filmi music

Notes

A:Naushad won the 1954 award for the song "Tu Ganga Ki Mauj", sung by Mohammed Rafi, and not the entire album.
B:S. D. Burman won the 1955 award for the song "Jaye To Jaye Kahan", sung by Talat Mahmood, and not the entire album.

References

External links
 Filmfare Awards Best Music Director

Music Director
Film awards for Best Music Director
Indian music awards